The Captain (French: Le capitan) is a 1946 French historical adventure film directed by Robert Vernay and starring Pierre Renoir, Claude Génia, and Jean Pâqui. It was based on a novel by Michel Zévaco. The film's sets were designed by René Renoux. It is a swashbuckler set in the reign of Louis XIII.

Cast

References

Bibliography 
 Dayna Oscherwitz & MaryEllen Higgins. The A to Z of French Cinema. Scarecrow Press, 2009.

External links 
 

1946 films
1940s historical adventure films
French historical adventure films
1940s French-language films
Films directed by Robert Vernay
Films set in Paris
Films set in the 1610s
French black-and-white films
Cultural depictions of Louis XIII
Cultural depictions of Marie de' Medici
Cultural depictions of Cardinal Richelieu
French swashbuckler films
1940s French films